Tzʼutujil  is a Mayan language spoken by the Tzʼutujil people in the region to the south of Lake Atitlán in Guatemala.  Tzʼutujil is closely related to its larger neighbors, Kaqchikel and Kʼicheʼ.  The 2002 census found 60,000 people speak Tzʼutujil as their mother tongue. The two Tzʼutijil dialects are Eastern and Western.

The majority of the Tzʼutujil people have Spanish as their second language, although many of the older people, or those in more remote locations do not. Many children also do not learn Spanish until they go to school around the age of five although more importance is now being placed upon it due to the influx of tourism into the region. As of 2012, the Community Library Rijaʼtzuul Naʼooj in San Juan La Laguna features story telling for children in Tzʼutujil; bilingual children's books are also available. Spanish is used in written communication.

Phonology
In the charts below each of the Tzʼutujil phonemes is represented by the character or set of characters that denote it in the standard orthography developed by the Guatemalan Academy of Mayan Languages (ALMG) and sanctioned by the Guatemalan government.
Where different, the corresponding symbol in the International Phonetic Alphabet appears in brackets.

Stress is always on the final syllable of native words, except for the adjectival vowel suffix in certain environments.

Vowels
Tzʼutujil has five short and five long vowels.

Ee and oo tend to be more open before a glottal stop.

Many words allow either a and e, and although many allow a only, there are few which require e, suggesting that  is merging into .  A smaller number of words allow either a or o.

Consonants
Like other Mayan languages, Tzʼutujil does not distinguish voiced and voiceless stops and affricates but instead distinguishes pulmonic and glottalized stops and affricates.

The glottalized stop kʼ and affricates chʼ, tzʼ are ejective, while bʼ, tʼ are voiced implosives before vowels, and ejectives elsewhere  (before consonants and at the ends of words).  Qʼ may be either ejective or implosive before vowels, ejective elsewhere.

The pulmonic stops and affricates, p, t, tz, ch, k, q, are tenuis before vowels and aspirated elsewhere.

Velar k, kʼ are palatalized before i, and also usually before a non-back vowel (i, e, a) followed by a post-velar (q, qʼ, j), though the latter dissimilation is not completely productive.

W is  before front vowels (i, e) and  before non-front vowels (a, o, u).

J is a post-velar  in most positions, but  before two consonants or a word-final consonant.

At the beginning of a morpheme, there is no distinction between glottal stop and zero:  Monosyllabic forms always have a glottal stop, with the exception of a few grammatical forms which never do, and when prefixed the glottal stop is retained.  With polysyllabic forms the glottal stop is optional, and when prefixed it is not retained. Usually initial glottal stops are invisible to the morphology, but in some words they are treated as consonants.

The nasals, m, n, are partially devoiced word-finally:  they start off voiced, and end up voiceless.

Sample words and phrases 

 or  – 'thank-you'
 – 'you're welcome' (also said after finishing every meal)
 – 'good morning'
 – 'good afternoon'
 – 'good night'
 – 'good-bye'

 – 'let's go!'
 – 'how are you?'
 – 'yes'
 or  – 'no'

Notes

References 
 
 
 Grimes, Larry. "Tzʼutujil Phonetics". Mayan Languages Collection of Larry Grimes. The Archive of the Indigenous Languages of Latin America: www.ailla.utexas.org. Media: audio. Access: public. Resource: TZJ003R001.

External links 

 Introductory Tzʼutujil document (PDF)

Agglutinative languages
Mayan languages
Indigenous languages of Central America
Mesoamerican languages
Languages of Guatemala